Abu Muhammad al-Hasan al-Muhallabi (died 963) was an Arab statesman who served as the vizier of the Buyid amir Mu'izz al-Dawla. He was from the prominent Muhallabi family.

He was born in 903, and was the son of Muhammad ibn Harun, an Arab from the Muhallabi family. Al-Muhallabi later served as the administrator of Ahvaz, and soon began serving the Buyids who were the new masters of Iraq and western Iran. Al-Muhallabi quickly rose as a prominent figure at the Buyid court, and later became the companion of Abu Ja'far Saymari, the chief secretary of Mu'izz al-Dawla, who was the Buyid ruler of Iraq. In 950/951, Mu'izz al-Dawla appointed as Muhallabi his vizier and gave him the title of ostadh.

In 950/951, Mu'izz al-Dawla, after constant conflict against the Batihah ruler 'Imran ibn Shahin, sent an army under the joint command of al-Muhallabi and the Daylamite general Ruzbahan.

Ruzbahan, who disliked al-Muhallabi, convinced him to directly attack 'Imran. He kept his forces in the rear and fled as soon as fighting between the two sides began. 'Imran used the terrain effectively, laying ambushes and confusing al-Muhallabi's army. Many of the al-Muhallabi's soldiers died in the fighting and he himself only narrowly escaped capture, swimming to safety. Mu'izz al-Daula then came to terms with 'Imran, acceding to his terms. Prisoners were exchanged and 'Imran was made a vassal of the Buyids, being instated as governor of the Batihah.

Al-Muhallabi died in 963 after having received a sickness during his campaign in Oman. According to Ibn Miskawayh, however, al-Muhallabi was poisoned by Mu'izz al-Dawla.

Sources 

 

Buyid viziers
963 deaths
10th-century Arabs
Year of birth unknown
Muhallabids